The 1926 Boston University Terriers football team was an American football team that represented Boston University as an independent during the 1926 college football season. In its first season under head coaches Reggie Brown and Edward N. Robinson, the team compiled a 2–6 record and was outscored by a total of 154 to 28.

Schedule

References

Boston University
Boston University Terriers football seasons
Boston University football